Chiraps paterata is a species of moth of the family Tortricidae. It is found in Taiwan.

References

Archipini
Moths described in 1914
Moths of Taiwan
Taxa named by Edward Meyrick